The National Convention Centre Canberra is a convention centre located in Canberra, Australia, which opened in 1989. The Centre is Canberra's largest, purpose-built functions, meetings and events venue, and is managed by InterContinental Hotels Group. It provides a collection of more than 13 spaces over two floors. The Centre hosts sporting events, concerts, trade fairs and meetings. The Royal Theatre, the largest space, can accommodate 2,460; the Exhibition Hall has space for up to 2,000. In 2005, the Centre underwent a $30 million capital upgrade.

Eric Clapton performed at the venue on 10 November 1990 during his Journeyman World Tour in front of a sold-out crowd of 10,000 people. On the evenings of 12 and 13 March 2009, a reformed Midnight Oil, with Garrett, played at the Royal Theatre.

See also
 Australia Forum

References

External links

 

Buildings and structures in Canberra
Tourist attractions in Canberra
Squash venues
Convention centres in Australia